Derrymore is a small village and townland in County Antrim, Northern Ireland. In the 2001 Census it had a population of 243 people. It lies on the shores of Lough Neagh, within the Armagh City, Banbridge and Craigavon Borough Council area.

The village is a linear settlement comprising residential development and a primary school, but no other community facilities.

Education 
St. Mary's Primary School

References 

NI Neighbourhood Information System

Villages in County Antrim
Townlands of County Antrim